Jean Black (born 10 March 1989 in Kinshasa) is a Congolese-born Angolan footballer who plays for FC Esperanza Pelt.

Club career
He left FC Oss in October 2011 after failing to become a regular in their starting line-up and moved into amateur football with De Treffers. In summer 2013 he moved to Belgian side Turnhout. After spells in Thailand and Angola he returned to Belgium in to play for RWDM in the second half of 2015.

He returned to De Treffers in January 2016, only to leave them in the summer of the same year.

He joined EVV in summer 2016 before switching to Esperanza Pelt later that year.

He signed for K. Achel VV in summer 2020.

Personal life
Black also works as a preacher in the Christian community.

References

External links

1989 births
Living people
Footballers from Kinshasa
Angolan footballers
Democratic Republic of the Congo footballers
Democratic Republic of the Congo people of Angolan descent
Association football forwards
FC Eindhoven players
TOP Oss players
De Treffers players
KFC Turnhout players
Jean Black
C.D. Huíla players
R.W.D. Molenbeek players
Eerste Divisie players
Angolan expatriates in the Netherlands
Angolan expatriates in Thailand
Democratic Republic of the Congo expatriates in the Netherlands
Democratic Republic of the Congo expatriate sportspeople in Thailand
Expatriate footballers in the Netherlands
Expatriate footballers in Belgium
Expatriate footballers in Thailand
21st-century Democratic Republic of the Congo people